Mark Owen Taylor (born 28 October 1967) is an Australian politician. He has been a Liberal Party member of the New South Wales Legislative Assembly since March 2015, representing the electorate of Seven Hills. He was previously a councillor of The Hills Shire.

Early life and background 

Taylor was born and raised in Toongabbie, Sydney.
He was educated at Model Farms High School in Baulkham Hills and James Ruse Agricultural High School in Carlingford. After school, Taylor commenced studies in environmental science at the University of Western Sydney while working for the Ku-ring-gai Council. In 1988 he joined the Australian Federal Police. In 1992 he joined the New South Wales Police Force. He was appointed a police prosecutor in 1995 and was admitted as a solicitor in 2003.

Political career 

Taylor was elected as a councillor of The Hills Shire at the 2012 New South Wales council elections and represented North Ward until 2017. In April 2014 it was reported that Taylor had been endorsed as the Liberal candidate for the revived seat of Seven Hills at the state election the following year. Taylor subsequently went on to win the seat with an 8% margin in 2015 and held it at a 6% margin in 2019 before it was abolished in the 2021 redistribution. Taylor registered to contest the new seat of Winston Hills at the 2023 election.

References 

1967 births
Australian police officers
Australian prosecutors
Australian solicitors
Living people
Lawyers from Sydney
Politicians from Sydney
Liberal Party of Australia members of the Parliament of New South Wales
Members of the New South Wales Legislative Assembly
21st-century Australian politicians
People educated at James Ruse Agricultural High School